The canton of Carhaix-Plouguer is an administrative division of the Finistère department, northwestern France. Its borders were modified at the French canton reorganisation which came into effect in March 2015. Its seat is in Carhaix-Plouguer.

It consists of the following communes:
 
Berrien
Bolazec
Botmeur
Brasparts
Brennilis
Carhaix-Plouguer
Cléden-Poher
Collorec
La Feuillée
Huelgoat
Kergloff
Landeleau
Lopérec
Loqueffret
Motreff
Plonévez-du-Faou
Plounévézel
Plouyé
Poullaouen
Saint-Hernin
Saint-Rivoal
Scrignac
Spézet

References

Cantons of Finistère